Andrićgrad (lit. "Andrić's town") is the name of a construction project located in Višegrad, Republika Srpska, Bosnia and Herzegovina by film director Emir Kusturica. The town is dedicated to the Yugoslav novelist and Nobel Prize winner Ivo Andrić.

Construction of Andrićgrad, also known as Kamengrad (Каменград, "Stonetown") started on 28 June 2011, and was officially opened on 28 June 2014, on Vidovdan. Andrićgrad is located several kilometers from Kusturica's first town, Drvengrad, in Serbia.

Andrićgrad was, in 2022, the venue used for the twelfth edition of Bina Mira, a youth festival that focuses on peace and equality between nations, that drew over 80 students from Belgium, Bosnia and Herzegovina, Croatia, Germany, Romania, Serbia and Slovenia.

Overview
Andrićgrad is located near the Mehmed Paša Sokolović Bridge, a UNESCO World Heritage Site, and stretches from the bridge up to the confluence of the Rzav River. After Küstendorf, this is the second village Kusturica created from scratch. Andrićgrad is to be used as a location for Kusturica's new film Na Drini ćuprija, based on the novel The Bridge on the Drina by Nobel Prize for Literature laureate Ivo Andrić.

The town has a lot of shops and services for incoming guests, amongst them are a gift shop, a kneipe, a restaurant, a cinema, a book shop and a gallery.

Honorary citizens
Honorary citizens are people who have been awarded with Key to the City. They are:

Milorad Dodik, President of Republika Srpska
Vuk Jeremić, President of the 67th session of the UN General Assembly
Matija Bećković, writer
Novak Đoković, tennis player

See also
Drvengrad

Gallery

References

External links

 (under construction, under name Kamengrad)
About Andricgrad at website of Tourist organization of Visegrad

Buildings and structures in Republika Srpska
Emir Kusturica
New towns
New towns started in the 2010s
Višegrad
Ivo Andrić